The Creek War of 1836, also known as the Second Creek War or Creek Alabama Uprising, was a conflict in Alabama at the time of Indian removal between the Muscogee Creek people and non-native land speculators and squatters.

Although the Creek people had been forced from Georgia under the Treaty of Washington of 1826, with many Lower Creeks moving to the Indian Territory, about 20,000 Upper Creeks were still living in Alabama.

The state acted to abolish tribal governments and extend state laws over the Creek. Chief Opothle Yohola appealed to the administration of President Andrew Jackson for protection from Alabama but he supported removal. The Creek signed the Treaty of Cusseta on 24 March 1832, which divided up Creek lands into individual allotments. Creeks could either sell their allotments and receive funds to remove to the west, or stay in Alabama as state and federal citizens, who would have to submit to state laws.

Land speculators and squatters began to defraud Creeks out of their allotments, resulting in some violent backlash from these Creeks. U.S. officials described the violence as a "war" in order to argue that the Creeks were thereby forfeiting their prior treaty rights.  Secretary of War Lewis Cass dispatched General Winfield Scott to end the violence by forcibly removing the Creeks to the Indian Territory west of the Mississippi River.

See also
 Battle of Pea River

Notes

References

Leitch Wright, James, Creeks & Seminoles : The Destruction and Regeneration of the Muscogulge People, Lincoln : University of Nebraska Press, 1986. 
Vandervort, Bruce, Indian Wars of Mexico, Canada and the United States, 1812-1900, New York ; London : Routledge, 2006. .

Conflicts in 1836
Wars between the United States and Native Americans
Muscogee
1836 in the United States
History of the Southern United States